Mor Polycarpus Geevarghese (1933  2011) was the Metropolitan of Evangelistic Association Of The East and Honnavar Mission of Jacobite Syrian Orthodox Church.

Early life
Mor Polycarpus was born on April 5, 1933 to Mr. Mathew Philipose and Mrs. Eliyamma of Nadayil Mulanilkkunnathil Famil, Chennithala, Pathanamthitta District, Kerala. St. George Jacobite Syrian Church, Chennithala was his home parish. He attended Eramathoor Ilavumood Primary School and NSS High School in Mannar. He completed SSLC in 1950, but decided to devote his life to the church rather than going on to study civil engineering.

Ordination
He was ordained as a Korooyo, or deacon, in the year 1956, then as Kassisso in 1957 at Manjanikkara Dayaro. He began his service in the Kozhichal and Kottamala parishes in Kasarkod district, also serving as vicar at St.Marys Church Meenangadi,(Kerala).

Metropolitan
On May 27, 1990 George Cor Episcopo was ordained as the Metropolitan of EAE and conferred the name Mor Polycarpus Geevarghese by Mor Ignatius Zakka I Iwas. The additional charge of Honnavar Mission was also given to Mor Polycarpus. Established various charity and social services and visited the South Canara Region(including Mangalore). Thereafter new priests were ordained and regular Sunday services were started in almost all the churches under the EAE and Honnavar Mission.

References

Syriac Orthodox Church bishops
1933 births
2011 deaths